John Philip Frederick of the Palatinate (16 September 1627 – 16 December 1650), was the seventh son of Frederick V, Elector Palatine (of the House of Wittelsbach), the "Winter King" of Bohemia, by his consort, the Scottish princess Elizabeth Stuart.

Early years 
Prince Philip was born in The Hague, where his parents lived in exile after his father lost the Battle of White Mountain and was driven from the thrones of both Bohemia and the Palatinate. His father, a Calvinist, died on 29 November 1632, when Philip was five years old.

He and his older brother Edward were educated at the French court, at the request of his elder brother, Charles I Louis, but were sent back to The Hague by request of their mother after the French temporarily took Charles Louis prisoner.

Scandal and exile
On the night of June 20th, 1646 Prince Philip killed the French exile Lieutenant Colonel Jacques de l'Epinay, Sieur de Vaux, in a duel or fight. Rumours declared that the taunt which had provoked Prince Philip to murder had been a boast of the French Don Juan that he had enjoyed the favours not only of Philip's older sister, the Princess Louise, but also of their widowed mother. 

In spite of repeated summonses, Prince Philip never appeared to answer the Dutch legal authorities. He became what Elizabeth had sworn that none of her sons should become, a soldier of fortune.

Military career and death 
Philip entered the military service of the Duke of Lorraine with the rank of colonel. He was killed at the Battle of Rethel on 16 December 1650, during the Fronde. His remains were returned to Sedan and were buried in the Church of Saint Charles.

Ancestry

References

Bibliography 
 Johann Michael von Söltl: Der Religionskrieg in Deutschland, Band 2, J. A. Meissner, 1840, S. 401 ff. (in German)
 Carl Eduard Vehse: Geschichte der deutschen Höfe seit der Reformation: 4. Abth., Geschichte der Höfe der Häuser Baiern, Würtemberg, Baden und Hessen; 2. Th, Band 24, Hoffmann und Campe, 1853, S. 101 (in German)

House of Palatinate-Simmern
Simmern, Edward, Count Palatine of
1627 births
1650 deaths
Princes of the Palatinate
Burials at the Church of the Holy Spirit, Heidelberg
Sons of kings